The Muttenstock is a mountain in the Glarus Alps, located on the border between the cantons of Glarus and Graubünden. It overlooks three lakes: Limmernsee and Muttsee on the west side, and Lag da Pigniu on the east side. The Muttenstock is situated a few kilometres north of the Kisten Pass (2,503 m).

References

Mountains of the Alps
Alpine three-thousanders
Mountains of Switzerland
Mountains of the canton of Glarus
Mountains of Graubünden
Ilanz/Glion